This is a list of assets owned by the mass media company News Corp.

Television

News Corp Australia
 Foxtel (65%) 
 Fox Sports Australia
 Fox Sports News
 Fox Cricket
 Fox Footy
 Fox League
 Foxtel Networks
 Fox8
 Fox Classics
 Fox Crime
 Real Life
 Fox One
 Fox Showcase
 Fox Comedy
 Fox Sci Fi
 Fox Sleuth
 Fox Docos
 BoxSets
 Lifestyle
 Lifestyle Food
 Lifestyle Home
 Fox Arena
 A&E
 History
 Crime + Investigation
 Nickelodeon (35%; joint venture with Paramount Global)
 Nick Jr.
 NickMusic
 Main Event (66.6%; joint venture with Optus Television)
 Foxtel Movies
 UltraHD
 Premiere
 Family
 Kids
 Action
 Comedy
 Thriller
 Romance
 Drama
 Hits
 Greats
 LMN
 Streamotion
 Kayo Sports
 Binge
 Flash
 Australian News Channel
 Sky News Australia
 Sky News New Zealand
 Sky News on WIN
 Sky News Weather
 Sky News Extra
 Australia Channel (News Streaming channel)

News UK
 TalkTV

Internet
 news.com.au
Punters.com.au – Australian horse racing and bookmaker affiliate
 SuperCoach
tips.com.au
 hipages
racenet.com.au 
 odds.com.au
 Mogo
 onebigswitch.com.au
 Knewz, a news aggregator
 REA Group (about 60%) including realestate.com.au
Business Spectator 
eurekareport.com.au
Australia's Best Recipes – bestrecipes.com.au
delicious.com.au including extensions delicious. Travel, delicious. Eat Out, the American Express delicious. Month Out, Studio delicious., delicious. Drinks and delicious. Produce Awards
Kidspot.com.au
taste.com.au 
homelife.com.au
myfun.com

Advertising, Branding & Tech

Global 
 Storyful

News UK 
 bridge studio
 wireless Group
 wireless studios
 urban media
 First Radio
 Switchdigital
 TIBUS
 ZESTY

News Corp Australia 
 SUDDENLY - Content Agency
 Medium Rare Content Agency
 HT&E (Here, There & Everywhere)
 News Xtend

Radio

News UK 
 wireless Group
 talkSPORT
 talkSPORT 2
 talkRADIO
 Virgin Radio
 Virgin Radio Anthems
 Virgin Radio Chilled
 Virgin Radio Groove
 FM104
 Q102
 96FM
 c103
 Live 95FM
 LMFM
 U105

 Times Radio

Magazines and Inserts (digital and print)

News Corp Australia 
 Big League
 body+soul
 Broncos
 Business Daily
 delicious
 Escape
 Foxtel
 GQ Australia
 Hit
 Kidspot
 Mansion Australia
 Motoring
 Sportsman
 Super Food Ideas
 taste.com.au
 The Deal
 The Weekend Australian Magazine
 Vogue Australia
 Vogue Living
 Whimn
 Wish

News & Magazines (digital and print)

United Kingdom

News UK
 The Sun
 The Times
 The Sunday Times
 Press Association (part owned, News UK is one of 26 shareholders)
 The Times Literary Supplement (TLS)

Australia

News Corp Australia

National
 The Australian including weekly insert magazine The Deal and monthly insert magazine (wish)
 The Weekend Australian
 Australian Associated Press (formerly)
 news.com.au

New South Wales
The Daily Telegraph
The Sunday Telegraph including insert magazine sundaymagazine

Victoria
Herald Sun
Sunday Herald Sun including insert magazine sundaymagazine

Queensland
The Courier-Mail including weekly insert magazine QWeekend
The Sunday Mail
Brisbane News

South Australia
The Advertiser including the monthly insert The Adelaide magazine
Sunday Mail

Tasmania
The Mercury
The Sunday Tasmanian

Northern Territory
Northern Territory News
Sunday Territorian

Community suburban newspapers

Sydney
Cumberland/Courier (NSW) newspapers
Blacktown Advocate
Canterbury-Bankstown Express
Central
Central Coast Express Advocate
Fairfield Advance
Hills Shire Times
Hornsby and Upper North Shore Advocate
Inner West Courier
Liverpool Leader
Macarthur Chronicle
Mt Druitt-St Marys Standard
NINETOFIVE
North Shore Times
Northern District Times
NORTHSIDE
Parramatta Advertiser
Penrith Press
Rouse Hill Times
Southern Courier
The Manly Daily
The Mosman Daily
Village Voice Balmain
Wentworth Courier

Melbourne
Leader (Vic) newspapers
Bayside Leader
Berwick/Pakenham Cardinia Leader
Brimbank Leader
Caulfield Glen Eira/Port Philip Leader
Cranbourne Leader
Dandenong/Springvale Dandenong Leader
Diamond Valley Leader
Frankston Standard/Hastings Leader
Free Press Leader
Heidelberg Leader
Hobsons Bay Leader
Hume Leader
Knox Leader
Lilydale & Yarra Valley Leader
Manningham Leader
Maribyrnong Leader
Maroondah Leader
Melbourne Leader
Melton/Moorabool Leader
Moonee Valley Leader
Moorabbin Kingston/Moorabbin Glen Eira Leader
Mordialloc Chelsea Leader
Moreland Leader
Mornington Peninsula Leader
Northcote Leader
Preston Leader
Progress Leader
Stonnington Leader
Sunbury/Macedon Ranges Leader
Waverley/Oakleigh Monash Leader
Whitehorse Leader
Whittlesea Leader
Wyndham Leader

Brisbane
Quest (QLD) newspapers
Albert & Logan News (Fri)
Albert & Logan News (Wed)
Caboolture Shire Herald
Caloundra Journal
City News
City North News
City South News
Ipswich News
Logan West Leader
Maroochy Journal
North-West News
Northern Times
Northside Chronicle
Pine Rivers Press/North Lakes Times
Redcliffe and Bayside Herald
South-East Advertiser
South-West News/Springfield News
Southern Star
The Noosa Journal
weekender
Westside News
Wynnum Herald
Weekender Essential Sunshine Coast

Adelaide
Messenger (SA) newspapers
Adelaide Matters
City Messenger
City North Messenger
East Torrens Messenger
Eastern Courier Messenger
Guardian Messenger
Hills & Valley Messenger
Leader Messenger
News Review Messenger
Portside Messenger
Southern Times Messenger
Weekly Times Messenger

Perth
Community (WA) newspapers (50.1%) (Formerly)
Advocate
Canning Times
Comment News
Eastern Reporter
Fremantle-Cockburn Gazette
Guardian Express
Hills-Avon Valley Gazette
Joondalup-Wanneroo Times
Mandurah Coastal / Pinjarra Murray Times
Melville Times
Midland-Kalamunda Reporter
North Coast Times
Southern Gazette
Stirling Times
Weekend-Kwinana Courier
Weekender
Western Suburbs Weekly

Darwin
Sun (NT) newspapers
Darwin Sun
Litchfield Sun
Palmerston Sun

Regional and rural newspapers

New South Wales
Tweed Sun
Tweed Daily News

Victoria
Echo
Geelong Advertiser
GeelongNEWS
The Weekly Times

Queensland
Bowen Independent
Burdekin Advocate
Cairns Sun
Gold Coast Bulletin
Gold Coast Sun
Herbert River Express
Home Hill Observer
Innisfail Advocate
Northern Miner
Port Douglas & Mossman Gazette
Tablelander – Atherton
Tablelands Advertiser
The Cairns Post
The Noosa News
The Sunshine Coast Daily
Townsville Bulletin
Toowoomba Chronicle
Townsville Sun
weekender
Daily Mercury (Mackay)

TasmaniaDerwent Valley GazetteTasmanian CountryNorthern TerritoryCentralian AdvocatePapua New GuineaPapua New Guinea Post-Courier (63%)

United StatesFox Corporation including Fox NewsNew York PostThe Wall Street JournalInvestor's Business Dailyrealtor.comMove (80%)

International
Dow Jones & CompanyConsumer Media GroupThe Wall Street Journal – the leading US financial newspaper
Wall Street Journal Europe closed
The Wall Street Journal Asia closed
Barron's – weekly financial markets magazine
Marketwatch – financial news and information website
Financial News
Heat Street - news and opinion website
Mansion Global - global luxury property websiteEnterprise Media GroupDow Jones Newswires – global, real-time news and information provider.
Factiva – provides business news and information together with content delivery tools and services.
Dow Jones Indexes – stock market indexes and indicators, including the Dow Jones Industrial Average. (10% ownership)
Dow Jones Financial Information Services – produces databases, electronic media, newsletters, conferences, directories, and other information services on specialised markets and industry sectors.
Betten Financial News – leading Dutch language financial and economic news service.Strategic AlliancesSTOXX (33%) – joint venture with Deutsche Boerse and SWG Group for the development and distribution of Dow Jones STOXX indices.Wireless Group''
Talksport
TalkRadio

Books
 HarperCollins
 4th Estate
 Collins
 Ecco Press
 Harlequin Enterprises
 Harper Perennial
 Harper Voyager
 HMH Books & Media
 Kappa Books
 Modern Publishing
 Unisystems Inc.
 Zondervan Publishing (Christian publishing company taken over by HarperCollins in 1988)
 Thomas Nelson (Christian publishing company taken over by HarperCollins in 2011)
 Inspirio – religious gift production

Former assets

Sold
 TV Guide
 TV Guide Magazine
 Dow Jones Local Media Group
 Star
 San Antonio Express-News
 Armada Holdings
 South China Morning Post
 Seventeen
 Amplify Education
 Ansett Australia
 Daily Racing Form
 The Weekly Standard
 Boston Herald
 Myspace
 Vedomosti (33%) – Russia's leading financial newspaper (joint venture with Financial Times and Independent Media). (Stake sold in 2015)
 Los Angeles Dodgers
 Remodelista (2016-2019)
 Gardenista (2016-2019)

Defunct
 Authonomy via HarperCollins (closed in 2015)
 The Daily (2011-2012)
 News of the World (1843-2011) (closed)
 Today (1986-1995)
 The London Paper (2006-2009)
 Consolidated Media Holdings (2007-2012)
 Publishing and Broadcasting Limited (1994-2007)
 Sky News Business/Your Money (2008-2019)
 Far Eastern Economic Review
 Fox Funny (2019-2023)

See also
 Lists of corporate assets
 21st Century Fox, the former News Corporation
 Fox Corporation

References

External links
 News Corp website
 NewsSpace, "a site for media professionals, combining News Limited's media platforms into one location – newspapers, magazines and digital brands"

News Corp